Anatolian or anatolica may refer to:

 Anything of, from, or related to the region Anatolia
 Anatolians, ancient Indo-European peoples who spoke the Anatolian languages
 Anatolian High School, a type of Turkish educational institution
 Anatolian Plate, the tectonic plate on which Turkey sits
 Anatolian hieroglyphs, a script of central Anatolia
 Anatolian languages, a group of extinct Indo-European languages
 Anatolian rock, a genre of rock music from Turkey
 Anatolian Shepherd, a breed of dog

See also
 
 
 
 Anadolu (disambiguation)
 Anatolia (disambiguation)

Language and nationality disambiguation pages